Magallanodon is a genus of mammals from the extinct group Gondwanatheria. It contains a single species, Magallanodon baikashkenke. The species is the first Mesozoic mammal known from Chile, and is Late Cretaceous in age. It is known from individual teeth found in a quarry in the Río de Las Chinas Valley and La Anita Farm located in the Magallanes Basin in Patagonia. The fossils come from the Dorotea Formation and Chorrillo Formation, which is Late Campanian to Early Maastrichtian in age.

Etymology 
The name Magallanodon comes from the Magallanes Region in southern Chile and odontos, Greek for tooth. The species name, M. baikashkenke is taken from the Tehuelchian words bai (grandfather) and kashkenke (valley) - Grandfather's Valley is the name for the region where the fossil was first found, also called the Río de Las Chinas.

References 

Gondwanatheres
Campanian life
Maastrichtian life
Cretaceous mammals of South America
Late Cretaceous tetrapods of South America
Cretaceous Chile
Fossils of Chile
 
Fossil taxa described in 2020
Taxa named by Francisco J. Goin